On 15 May 1988, the Ulster Volunteer Force launched a gun attack on the Avenue Bar on Union Street in the  city centre of Belfast, Northern Ireland, killing three Catholic civilians and wounding six others.  The bar was close to the Unity Flats complex and as a result was frequented mostly by Catholics.

Background

In 1988 both the UVF and the UDA had stepped up their campaigns against the Nationalist community, in part due to receiving a large arms shipment of handguns and assault rifles from South Africa.  On 15 January the UVF shot dead Catholic civilian Billy Kane at his home in the New Lodge.  The objective of the Avenue Bar attack was to kill a leading Republican from the Unity Flats. The bar had already been targeted by the UVF in 1973 in a bomb attack in which a Catholic pensioner, Francis McNelis, was killed.

The shooting

The attack happened at 2:20pm when the bar was crowded with Sunday drinkers. Two gunmen walked into the pub after being admitted through an electronic security door.  A witness said they at first seemed to be looking for someone, but then opened fire indiscriminately with automatic weapons. People threw glasses at the gunmen in an attempt to fight them off.  The gunmen escaped in a car which had been hijacked 20 minutes earlier on the Shankill Road, and which was found abandoned at Carlow Street behind Shankill Leisure Centre shortly after the attack.   The three victims were Stephen McGahan (27), from the New Lodge, Damien Devlin (24), from Andersonstown, and Paul McBride (27), from Ardoyne. The UVF almost managed to kill another leading Provisional IRA member from the Unity Flats who was drinking in the bar at the time of the attack.

Aftermath
In January 1990 three self-confessed Ulster Volunteer Force volunteers were sentenced to life for the parts they played in the Avenue Bar shooting along with the killing of another Catholic civilian on 15 January 1988 in Upper Meadow Street, Belfast. .

A month after the killings at the bar, on the 15 June 1988, the Provisional IRA (PIRA) shot dead a UVF commander, Robert "Squeak" Seymour, who the PIRA alleged had ordered the Avenue Bar attack. He was killed by the PIRA in an alley behind his video shop in Woodstock Road, east Belfast.

See also
Timeline of Ulster Volunteer Force actions
Loughinisland massacre

References
Notes

Ulster Volunteer Force actions
Terrorist incidents in the United Kingdom in 1988
1980s murders in Northern Ireland
1988 crimes in Ireland
1988 murders in the United Kingdom
1988 in Northern Ireland
Massacres in Northern Ireland
Deaths by firearm in Northern Ireland
1980s mass shootings in the United Kingdom 
Mass shootings in Northern Ireland
May 1988 events in the United Kingdom
Attacks on bars in Northern Ireland
1988 mass shootings in Europe